Nicolai Jørgensgaard Graakjær (born 22.10.1972) is a Danish Professor at the Department of Communications and Psychology at Aalborg University. His research areas are Music in advertising, sound branding, Sounds of sports, and Social psychology.

Education and career 
Nicolai Jørgensgaard Graakjær holds a degree in music (1997) and psychology (1999) from Aalborg University. From 1997 to 1999 he was also a guest lector at Aalborg University. Afterwards, he was a high school teacher for a year where he also completed the professional postgraduate teacher training. From 2000-2003 he was a teaching assistant. In 2008 he received his Ph.D. in music in tv-commercials and he is a leading Professor in this area. 

Since 2010 he has been head of the knowledge group MÆRKK of the Department of Communications and Psychology at Aalborg University. He has also been Editor-in-Chief for Mediekultur (2008-2012) and for MÆRKK – Æstetik og Kommunikation / Aalborg Universitetsforlag (2012-). 

Moreover, he has appeared in the media often.

Publications 
Nicolai Jørgensgaard Graakjær has published over 100 publications including 7 books

 Graakjær, N. J. (2023). The Sounds of Spectators at Football. Bloomsbury Academic.
 Jessen, I. B., & Graakjær, N. J. (Eds.) (2020). Medieæstetik - Politik, hverdagsliv og forbrugskultur. (1 ed.) Aalborg Universitetsforlag. MÆRKK – Æstetik og Kommunikation
 Allingham, P., Graakjær, N. J., Grøn, R., & Jantzen, C. (Eds.) (2019). Stemningens æstetik. Aalborg Universitetsforlag. MÆRKK – Æstetik og Kommunikation No. 8
 Graakjær, N. J. (2015). Analyzing music in advertising: Television commercials and consumer choice. (1 ed.) Routledge. Routledge Interpretive Marketing Research https://doi.org/10.4324/9781315770277
 Graakjær, N. J., & Jessen, I. B. (Eds.) (2015). Selektion: Om udvælgelse af medietekster til analyse. Systime Academic. MÆRKK – Æstetik og Kommunikation No. 4
 Graakjær, N. J. (2011). Musik i tv-reklamer: Teori og analyse. (1 ed.). Samfundslitteratur.
 Graakjær, N. J., & Jantzen, C. (Eds.) (2009). Music in Advertising: Commercial Sounds in Media Communication and Other Settings. Aalborg Universitetsforlag.

Other selected publications:

 Graakjær, N. J. (2021). Club Foot for football – on the (re)construction of meanings of music and football through a television title sequence. Sport in Society, 24(1), 22-37. https://doi.org/10.1080/17430437.2020.1795133
 Graakjær, N. J. (2021). The sounds of Coca-Cola - on "Cola-nization" of sound and music. In J. Deaville, S-L. Tan, & R. Rodman (Eds.), The Oxford Handbook of Music and Advertising (pp. 397-413). Oxford University Press.

 Graakjær, N. J. (2020). Sounds of soccer on-screen: A critical re-evaluation of the role of spectator sounds. The Journal of Popular Television, 8(2), 143-158. https://doi.org/10.1386/jptv_00015_1
 Graakjær, N. J. (2020). ‘Listen to the atmosphere!’: On spectator sounds and their potentially disruptive role in a football simulation video game. The Soundtrack, 11(1-2), 39-55. https://doi.org/10.1386/ts_00004_1
 Graakjær, N. J. (2019). Sounding out i’m lovin’ it – a multimodal discourse analysis of the sonic logo in commercials for McDonald’s 2003–2018. Critical Discourse Studies, 16(5), 569-582. https://doi.org/10.1080/17405904.2019.1624184
 Graakjær, N. J., & Bonde, A. (2018). Non-musical sound branding – a conceptualization and research overview. European Journal of Marketing, 52(7/8), 1505-1525. https://doi.org/10.1108/EJM-09-2017-0609
 Graakjær, N. J. (2014). The Bonding of a Band and a Brand: On Music Placement in Television Commercials from a Text Analytical Perspective. Popular Music & Society, 37(5), 517-537. https://doi.org/10.1080/03007766.2013.861242
 Jessen, I. B., & Graakjær, N. J. (2013). Cross-media communication in advertising: exploring multimodal connections between television commercials and websites. Visual Communication, 12(4), 437-458. https://doi.org/10.1177/1470357213497665
 Graakjær, N. J. (2012). Dance in the store: on the use and production of music in Abercrombie & Fitch. Critical Discourse Studies, 9(4), 393-406. https://doi.org/10.1080/17405904.2012.713208

References 

Academic staff of Aalborg University
1972 births
Living people
Aalborg University